The 10th Irish Film & Television Awards took place on Saturday 9 February 2013 at the Convention Centre Dublin (CCD) honouring Irish film and television released in 2012.
It was hosted by Irish actor Simon Delaney and attracted an audience of 1.24 million viewers. The Show was broadcast on RTÉ One Television on the night.

Big winners on the night included RTÉ crime-drama Love/Hate which took home six awards, including awards for Best Drama, Best Director David Caffrey and Writer TV Stuart Carolan.  Actors Tom Vaughan-Lawlor, Charlie Murphy and Susan Loughnane won awards for Actor Lead TV Drama, Actress Lead TV and Actress Support TV Drama respectively.
What Richard Did picked up five awards including the award for Best Film. Jack Reynor won for Actor Lead Film whilst Lenny Abrahamson and Malcolm Campbell picked up awards for Best Director and Script with Nathan Nugent winning for Editing — Film.

Winners

References

External links
IFTA 2013

2013 in Irish television
10